Tonosí Airport  is an airport serving Tonosí, a village in the Los Santos Province of Panama.

The runway has  of unpaved overrun on the north end.

See also

Transport in Panama
List of airports in Panama

References

External links
OpenStreetMap - Tonosí
Google Maps - Tonosí
FallingRain - Tonosí Airport

Airports in Panama